TechAmerica is a United States technology trade association. It was formed from the merger of AeA (formerly known as the America Electronics Association), the Cyber Security Industry Alliance (CSIA), the Government Electronics & Information Technology Association (GEIA), and the Information Technology Association of America (ITAA) in 2009.  The organization claims to be the "high-tech industry's leading trade association".  TechAmerica represents 1,200 companies within the public and commercial sectors of the economy.  TechAmerica's stated goal is to provide "grassroots to global" representation for its members.  To this end, the organization maintains an advocacy program in all 50 US state capitals, in Washington, DC, and in several international locations. In May 2014, CompTIA, a nonprofit trade association that serves IT professionals, announced it had acquired TechAmerica in a move to expand its public-sector presence.

History 
In 2009, AeA and ITAA merged to form TechAmerica.

AeA

AeA started as the West Coast Electronics Manufacturing Association (WCEMA), formed by David Packard and 25 of Hewlett-Packard's suppliers in 1943.  Within 20 years, the association had gathered over 200 members.  In 1969, WCEMA was rebranded the Western Electronic Manufacturers Association (WEMA).  Less than two years following that rebranding, membership reached to over 600.  Once again, the association was renamed in 1977 to the American Electronics Association. In 2001, the branding was shortened to AeA.

ITAA

The Association of Data Processing Services Organization (ADAPSO) was formed in 1961.  This association was renamed in 1991 to the Information Technology Association of America (ITAA). In 2008, ITAA merged with the Cyber Security Industry Alliance (CSIA) and the Government Electronics Industry Association (GEIA).

2012 Cyber Attack

The organization's website was attacked in April 2012 for their support of the controversial CISPA bill.

Sale of standards program
In July 2013, TechAmerica sold its standards program to SAE International.

Four lobbyists depart, TechAmerica sues for breach of employee contract
On November 4, 2013 it was announced that four TechAmerica lobbyists: Trey Hodgkins, Pam Walker, Erica McCann and Carol Henton had resigned, lured to the Information Technology Industry Council (ITI) which was able to raise $50,000 each from more than a dozen of its members to fund the acquisition of the four TechAmerica lobbyists.

TechAmerica filed a lawsuit against ITI and three of the departing lobbyists in D.C. Superior Court. TechAmerica's complaints include that the defecting lobbyists conspired in their new positions to use old contacts and other information acquired while at TechAmerica to help ITI find new clients for its neophyte effort focused on government procurement

Locations 

 Washington, DC (Headquarters)
 Silicon Valley
 Beijing, China

Services

Publications

 Cyberstates - A report which quantifies the high-tech industry on a state-by-state basis in the United States.
 Competitiveness Series - Reports covering relevant issues within the high-tech industry and U.S. competitiveness.

Senior staff 

Todd Thibodeaux
President & CEO

Elizabeth Hyman
Executive Vice President, Public Advocacy

Nancy Hammervik
Senior Vice President, Industry Relations

David Sommer
Chief Financial Officer

L. Daniel Liutikas
Chief Legal Officer

References

Technology trade associations
Mass media companies